David Holt (born 1966) is an Australian and former England international lawn and indoor bowler.

He first became interested in the sport because his father was a crown green bowler, and he started bowling aged 12, joining the Winton crown green bowls club. His first experience of flat green bowling was on a two-rink indoor facility that was opened near to his house at the Swinton Pool Hall.

Holt won a gold medal in the fours with John Ottaway, Simon Skelton and Robert Newman at the 2002 Commonwealth Games in Manchester. One year later he won the pairs with Tony Allcock in the 2003 World Indoor Bowls Championship in Yarmouth.

He won three English National Championship titles in 1987 (singles & pairs) and 2000 (fours).

In 2017 he represented Australia in the 2017 World Indoor Bowls Championship after switching allegiance from England.

References

1966 births
Living people
English male bowls players
Commonwealth Games medallists in lawn bowls
Commonwealth Games gold medallists for England
Indoor Bowls World Champions
Bowls players at the 2002 Commonwealth Games
Medallists at the 2002 Commonwealth Games